The Blues; That's Me! is an album by jazz saxophonist Illinois Jacquet which was recorded in 1969, and released on the Prestige label.

Reception

Scott Yanow of Allmusic stated, "Tenor saxophonist Illinois Jacquet is heard in top form throughout this quintet set... The music, which falls between swing, bop and early R&B, is generally quite exciting... highly recommended".

Track listing 
All compositions by Illinois Jacquet except where noted.
 "The Blues; That's Me!" (Tiny Grimes) – 10:28     
 "Still King" (Frank Foster, Illinois Jacquet) – 3:52     
 "'Round Midnight" (Thelonious Monk) – 6:53     
 "The Galloping Latin" – 5:28     
 "For Once in My Life" (Ron Miller, Orlando Murden) – 7:02     
 "Every Day I Have the Blues" (Peter Chatman) – 6:25

Personnel 
Illinois Jacquet – tenor saxophone, bassoon
Wynton Kelly – piano
Tiny Grimes – guitar
Buster Williams – bass
Oliver Jackson – drums

References 

1969 albums
Illinois Jacquet albums
Prestige Records albums
Albums produced by Don Schlitten
Albums recorded at Van Gelder Studio